Columbidae is a bird family consisting of doves and pigeons. It is the only family in the order Columbiformes. These are stout-bodied birds with short necks and short slender bills that in some species feature fleshy ceres. They primarily feed on seeds, fruits, and plants. The family occurs worldwide, but the greatest variety is in the Indomalayan and Australasian realms.

The family contains 344 species divided into 50 genera. Thirteen of the species are extinct.

In English, the smaller species tend to be called "doves" and the larger ones "pigeons". However, the distinction is not consistent, and does not exist in most other languages. Historically, the common names for these birds involve a great deal of variation among the terms. The bird most commonly referred to as just "pigeon" is the domestic pigeon, which is common in many cities as the feral pigeon.

Doves and pigeons build relatively flimsy nests, often using sticks and other debris, which may be placed on branches of trees, on ledges, or on the ground, depending on species. They lay one or (usually) two white eggs at a time, and both parents care for the young, which leave the nest after 25–32 days. Unfledged baby doves and pigeons are called squabs and are generally able to fly by 5 weeks of age. These fledglings, with their immature squeaking voices, are called squeakers once they are weaned or weaning. Unlike most birds, both sexes of doves and pigeons produce "crop milk" to feed to their young, secreted by a sloughing of fluid-filled cells from the lining of the crop.

Etymology
 is a French word that derives from the Latin , for a "peeping" chick, while dove is an ultimately Germanic word that refers to the bird's diving flight. The English dialectal word  appears to derive from Latin . A group of doves is called a "dule", taken from the French word  ('mourning').

Origin and evolution
Columbiformes is one of the most diverse non-passerine clades of neoavians, and its origins are in the Cretaceous and the result of a rapid diversification at the end of the K-Pg boundary. Whole genome analyses have found the columbiformes form a sister clade of a group conformed by the sandgrouses (Pterocliformes) and mesites (Mesitornithiformes).

Taxonomy and systematics

The name 'Columbidae' for the family was introduced by the English zoologist William Elford Leach in a guide to the contents of the British Museum published in 1820. Columbidae is the only living family in the order Columbiformes. The sandgrouse (Pteroclidae) were formerly placed here, but were moved to a separate order, Pterocliformes, based on anatomical differences (such as the inability to drink by "sucking" or "pumping").

The Columbidae are usually divided into five subfamilies, probably inaccurately. For example, the American ground and quail doves (Geotrygon), which are usually placed in the Columbinae, seem to be two distinct subfamilies. The order presented here follows Baptista etal. (1997), with some updates.

The arrangement of genera and naming of subfamilies is in some cases provisional because analyses of different DNA sequences yield results that differ, often radically, in the placement of certain (mainly Indo-Australian) genera. This ambiguity, probably caused by long branch attraction, seems to confirm the first pigeons evolved in the Australasian region, and that the "Treronidae" and allied forms (crowned and pheasant pigeons, for example) represent the earliest radiation of the group.

The family Columbidae previously also contained the family Raphidae, consisting of the extinct Rodrigues solitaire and the dodo. These species are in all likelihood part of the Indo-Australian radiation that produced the three small subfamilies mentioned above, with the fruit doves and pigeons (including the Nicobar pigeon). Therefore, they are here included as a subfamily Raphinae, pending better material evidence of their exact relationships.

Exacerbating these issues, columbids are not well represented in the fossil record. No truly primitive forms have been found to date. The genus Gerandia has been described from Early Miocene deposits in France, but while it was long believed to be a pigeon, it is now considered a sandgrouse. Fragmentary remains of a probably "ptilinopine" Early Miocene pigeon were found in the Bannockburn Formation of New Zealand and described as Rupephaps; "Columbina" prattae from roughly contemporary deposits of Florida is nowadays tentatively separated in Arenicolumba, but its distinction from Columbina/Scardafella and related genera needs to be more firmly established (e.g. by cladistic analysis). Apart from that, all other fossils belong to extant genera.

List of genera 
Fossil species of uncertain placement:
 Genus †Arenicolumba Steadman, 2008
 Genus †Rupephaps Worthy, Hand, Worthy, Tennyson, & Scofield, 2009 (St. Bathans pigeon, Miocene of New Zealand)

Subfamily Columbinae (typical pigeons and doves) 

 Tribe Zenaidini [Leptotilinae] (quail-doves and allies)
 Genus Geotrygon (10 species)
 Genus Starnoenas (blue-headed quail-dove)
 Genus Leptotrygon (olive-backed quail-dove)
 Genus Leptotila (11 species)
 Genus Zenaida (7 species)
 Genus Zentrygon (8 species)
 Tribe Columbini
 Genus Patagioenas (American pigeons, 17 species)
 Genus †Ectopistes (passenger pigeon; extinct 1914)
 Genus Reinwardtoena (3 species)
 Genus Turacoena (3 species)
 Genus Macropygia (typical cuckoo-doves, 15 species)
 Genus Streptopelia (turtle doves and collared doves, 13 species)
 Genus †Dysmoropelia Olson, 1975 (Saint Helena dove) (prehistoric)
 Genus Columba (Old World pigeons, 35 species of which 2 recently extinct)
 Genus Spilopelia (2 species)
 Genus Nesoenas (3 species)

Subfamily Claravinae (American ground doves) 

 Genus Claravis (blue ground dove)
 Genus Paraclaravis (2 species)
 Genus Uropelia (long-tailed ground dove)
 Genus Metriopelia (4 species)
 Genus Columbina (9 species)

Raphinae 

 Tribe Phabini (bronzewings and relatives)
 Genus Henicophaps (2 species)
 Genus Gallicolumba (bleeding-hearts and allies, 7 species)
 Genus Pampusana (13 species of which 3 recently extinct)
 Genus Ocyphaps (crested pigeon)
 Genus Petrophassa (rock pigeons, 2 species)
 Genus Leucosarcia (wonga pigeon)
 Genus Geopelia (5 species)
 Genus Phaps (Australian bronzewings, 3 species)
 Genus Geophaps (3 species)
 Tribe Raphini [Didunculinae; Otidiphabinae; Gourinae]
 Genus ?†Natunaornis (Viti Levu giant pigeon) (prehistoric)
 Genus Trugon (thick-billed ground pigeon)
 Genus †Microgoura (Choiseul crested pigeon, extinct early 20th century)
 Genus Otidiphaps (pheasant pigeon)
 Genus Goura (crowned pigeons, 4 species)
 Genus  Didunculus (tooth-billed pigeon)
 Genus  ?†Deliaphaps De Pietri, Scofield, Tennyson, Hand, & Worthy, 2017 (Zealandian dove, Miocene of New Zealand)
 Genus  Caloenas (Nicobar pigeon)
 Genus †Raphus (dodo, extinct late 17th century)
 Genus †Pezophaps (Rodrigues solitaire, extinct c. 1730)
 Genus †Bountyphaps Worthy & Wragg, 2008 (Henderson Island pigeon) (prehistoric)
 Tribe Turturini
 Genus Phapitreron (brown doves, 3 species)
 Genus Oena (Namaqua dove, tentatively placed here)
 Genus Turtur (wood doves, 5 species; tentatively placed here)
 Genus Chalcophaps (emerald doves, 3 species)
 Tribe Treronini
 Genus Treron (green pigeons, 30 species)
 Tribe Ptilinopini (fruit doves and imperial pigeons)
 Genus Ducula (imperial pigeons, 42 species)
 Genus Ptilinopus [Drepanoptila; Alectroenas] (fruit doves, some 50 living species, 1–2 recently extinct)
 Genus Hemiphaga (2 species)
 Genus Lopholaimus (topknot pigeon)
 Genus Cryptophaps (sombre pigeon)
 Genus Gymnophaps (mountain pigeons, 4 species)
 Genus  ?†Tongoenas Steadman & Takano, 2020 (Tongan giant pigeon) (prehistoric)

Description

Size and appearance 

One of the largest arboreal species, the Marquesan imperial pigeon, currently battles extinction.

Anatomy and physiology 
Overall, the anatomy of Columbidae is characterized by short legs, short bills with a fleshy cere, and small heads on large, compact bodies. Like some other birds, the Columbidae have no gall bladders. Some medieval naturalists concluded they have no bile (gall), which in the medieval theory of the four humours explained the allegedly sweet disposition of doves. In fact, however, they do have bile (as Aristotle had earlier realized), which is secreted directly into the gut.

The wings are large, and have eleven primary feathers; pigeons have strong wing muscles (wing muscles comprise 31–44% of their body weight) and are among the strongest fliers of all birds.

In a series of experiments in 1975 by Dr.Mark B. Friedman, using doves, their characteristic head bobbing was shown to be due to their natural desire to keep their vision constant. It was shown yet again in a 1978 experiment by Dr.Barrie J. Frost, in which pigeons were placed on treadmills; it was observed that they did not bob their heads, as their surroundings were constant.

Feathers

Columbidae have unique body feathers, with the shaft being generally broad, strong, and flattened, tapering to a fine point, abruptly. In general, the aftershaft is absent; however, small ones on some tail and wing feathers may be present. Body feathers have very dense, fluffy bases, are attached loosely into the skin, and drop out easily. Possibly serving as a predator avoidance mechanism, large numbers of feathers fall out in the attacker's mouth if the bird is snatched, facilitating the bird's escape. The plumage of the family is variable. 

Granivorous species tend to have dull plumage, with a few exceptions, whereas the frugivorous species have brightly coloured plumage. The Ptilinopus (fruit doves) are some of the brightest coloured pigeons, with the three endemic species of Fiji and the Indian Ocean Alectroenas being the brightest. Pigeons and doves may be sexually monochromatic or dichromatic. In addition to bright colours, pigeons may sport crests or other ornamentation.

Flight 

Columbidae are excellent fliers due to the lift provided by their large wings, which results in low wing loading; They are highly maneuverable in flight and have a low aspect ratio due to the width of their wings, allowing for quick flight launches and ability to escape from predators, but at a high energy cost.

Distribution and habitat 

Pigeons and doves are distributed everywhere on Earth, except for the driest areas of the Sahara Desert, Antarctica and its surrounding islands, and the high Arctic. They have colonised most of the world's oceanic islands, reaching eastern Polynesia and the Chatham Islands in the Pacific, Mauritius, the Seychelles and Réunion in the Indian Ocean, and the Azores in the Atlantic Ocean.

The family has adapted to most of the habitats available on the planet. These species may be arboreal, terrestrial, or semi-terrestrial. Various species also inhabit savanna, grassland, desert, temperate woodland and forest, mangrove forest, and even the barren sands and gravels of atolls.

Some species have large natural ranges. The eared dove ranges across the entirety of South America from Colombia to Tierra del Fuego, the Eurasian collared dove has a massive (if discontinuous) distribution from Britain across Europe, the Middle East, India, Pakistan and China, and the laughing dove across most of sub-Saharan Africa, as well as India, Pakistan, and the Middle East. Other species have tiny, restricted distributions; this is most common in island endemics. The whistling dove is endemic to the tiny Kadavu Island in Fiji, the Caroline ground dove is restricted to two islands, Truk and Pohnpei in the Caroline Islands, and the Grenada dove is restricted to Grenada in the Caribbean. Some continental species also have tiny distributions; for example, the black-banded fruit dove is restricted to a small area of the Arnhem Land of Australia, the Somali pigeon is restricted to a tiny area of northern Somalia, and Moreno's ground dove is restricted to the area around Salta and Tucuman in northern Argentina.

The largest range of any species is that of the rock dove. This species had a large natural distribution from Britain and Ireland to northern Africa, across Europe, Arabia, Central Asia, India, the Himalayas and up into China and Mongolia. The range of the species increased dramatically upon domestication, as the species went feral in cities around the world. The species is currently resident across most of North America, and has established itself in cities and urban areas in South America, sub-Saharan Africa, Southeast Asia, Japan, Australia, and New Zealand. The species is not the only pigeon to have increased its range due to the actions of man; several other species have become established outside of their natural range after escaping captivity, and other species have increased their natural ranges due to habitat changes caused by human activity. A 2020 study found that the East Coast of the U.S. includes two pigeon genetic megacities, in New York and Boston, and the birds do not mix together.

Behaviour

Feeding

Seeds and fruit form the major component of the diets of pigeons and doves. In fact, the family can be divided into the seed-eating or granivorous species (subfamily Columbinae) and the fruit-and-mast-eating or frugivorous species (the other four subfamilies). The granivorous species typically feed on seed found on the ground, whereas the frugivorous species tend to feed in trees. There are morphological adaptations that can be used to distinguish between the two groups: granivores tend to have thick walls in their gizzards, intestines, and esophagi whereas the frugivores tend to have thin walls. In addition, fruit-eating species have short intestines whereas those that eat seeds have longer ones. Frugivores are capable of clinging to branches and even hang upside down to reach fruit.

In addition to fruit and seeds, a number of other food items are taken by many species. Some, particularly the ground doves and quail-doves, eat a large number of prey items such as insects and worms. One species, the atoll fruit dove, is specialised in taking insect and reptile prey. Snails, moths, and other insects are taken by white-crowned pigeons, orange fruit doves, and ruddy ground doves.

Urban feral pigeons, descendants of domestic rock doves (Columbia Livia), reside in urban environments, disturbing their natural feeding habits. They depend on human activities and interactions to obtain food, causing them to forage for spilled food or food provided by humans.

Status and conservation 

While many species of pigeons and doves have benefited from human activities and have increased their ranges, many other species have declined in numbers and some have become threatened or even succumbed to extinction. Among the ten species to have become extinct since 1600 (the conventional date for estimating modern extinctions) are two of the most famous extinct species, the dodo and the passenger pigeon.

The passenger pigeon was exceptional for a number of reasons. In modern times, it is the only pigeon species that was not an island species to have become extinct even though it was once the most numerous species of bird on Earth. Its former numbers are difficult to estimate, but one ornithologist, Alexander Wilson, estimated one flock he observed contained over two billion birds. The decline of the species was abrupt; in 1871, a breeding colony was estimated to contain over a hundred million birds, yet the last individual in the species was dead by 1914. Although habitat loss was a contributing factor, the species is thought to have been massively over-hunted, being used as food for slaves and, later, the poor, in the United States throughout the 19thcentury.

The dodo, and its extinction, was more typical of the extinctions of pigeons in the past. Like many species that colonise remote islands with few predators, it lost much of its predator avoidance behaviour, along with its ability to fly. The arrival of people, along with a suite of other introduced species such as rats, pigs, and cats, quickly spelled the end for this species and all the other island forms that have become extinct.

Around 59 species of pigeons and doves are threatened with extinction today, about 19% of all species. Most of these are tropical and live on islands. All of the species are threatened by introduced predators, habitat loss, hunting, or a combination of these factors. In some cases, they may be extinct in the wild, as is the Socorro dove of Socorro Island, Mexico, last seen in the wild in 1972, driven to extinction by habitat loss and introduced feral cats. In some areas, a lack of knowledge means the true status of a species is unknown; the Negros fruit dove has not been seen since 1953, and may or may not be extinct, and the Polynesian ground dove is classified as critically endangered, as whether it survives or not on remote islands in the far west of the Pacific Ocean is unknown.

Various conservation techniques are employed to prevent these extinctions, including laws and regulations to control hunting pressure, the establishment of protected areas to prevent further habitat loss, the establishment of captive populations for reintroduction back into the wild (ex situ conservation), and the translocation of individuals to suitable habitats to create additional populations.

Military 

The pigeon was used in both World War I and World War II, notably by the Australian, French, German, American, and UK forces. They were also awarded with various laurels throughout, for their service. On 2 December 1943, three pigeonsWinkie, Tyke, and White Visionwere awarded the first Dickin medal, serving with Britain's Royal Air Force, for rescuing an air force crew during World WarII. Thirty-two pigeons have been decorated with the Dickin Medal, citing them for "brave service", for war contributions, including Commando, G.I. Joe, Paddy, Royal Blue, and William of Orange.

Cher Ami, a homing pigeon in World War I, was awarded the Croix de Guerre Medal, by France, with a palm Oak Leaf Cluster for his service in Verdun. Despite having almost lost a leg and being shot in the chest, he managed to travel around 25 miles to deliver the message that saved 194 men of the Lost Battalion of the 77th Infantry Division in the Battle of the Argonne, in October 1918. When Cher Ami died, he was mounted and is part of the permanent exhibit at the National Museum of American History of the Smithsonian Institution.

A grand ceremony was held in Buckingham Palace to commemorate a platoon of pigeons that braved the battlefields of Normandy to deliver vital plans to Allied forces on the fringes of Germany. Three of the actual birds that received the medals are on show in the London Military Museum so that well-wishers can pay their respects.

Domestication 

The rock dove has been domesticated for hundreds of years. It has been bred into several varieties kept by hobbyists, of which the best known is the homing pigeon or racing homer. Other popular breeds are tumbling pigeons such as the Birmingham roller, and fancy varieties that are bred for certain physical characteristics such as large feathers on the feet or fan-shaped tails. Domesticated rock pigeons are also bred as carrier pigeons, used for thousands of years to carry brief written messages, and release doves used in ceremonies. White doves are also used for entertainment and amusement, as they are capable of solving puzzles and performing intricate tricks. A variant called the zurito, bred for its speed, may be used in live pigeon shooting.

In religion 

In ancient Mesopotamia, doves were prominent animal symbols of Inanna-Ishtar, the goddess of love, sexuality, and war. Doves are shown on cultic objects associated with Inanna as early as the beginning of the third millennium BC. Lead dove figurines were discovered in the temple of Ishtar at Aššur, dating to the thirteenth century BC, and a painted fresco from Mari, Syria, shows a giant dove emerging from a palm tree in the temple of Ishtar, indicating that the goddess herself was sometimes believed to take the form of a dove. In the Epic of Gilgamesh, Utnapishtim releases a dove and a raven to find land; the dove merely circles and returns. Only then does Utnapishtim send forth the raven, which does not return, and Utnapishtim concludes the raven has found land.

In the ancient Levant, doves were used as symbols for the Canaanite mother goddess Asherah. The ancient Greek word for "dove" was peristerá, which may be derived from the Semitic phrase peraḥ Ištar, meaning "bird of Ishtar". In classical antiquity, doves were sacred to the Greek goddess Aphrodite, who absorbed this association with doves from Inanna-Ishtar. Aphrodite frequently appears with doves in ancient Greek pottery. The temple of Aphrodite Pandemos on the southwest slope of the Athenian Acropolis was decorated with relief sculptures of doves with knotted fillets in their beaks and votive offerings of small, white, marble doves were discovered in the temple of Aphrodite at Daphni. During Aphrodite's main festival, the Aphrodisia, her altars would be purified with the blood of a sacrificed dove. Aphrodite's associations with doves influenced the Roman goddesses Venus and Fortuna, causing them to become associated with doves as well.

In the Hebrew Bible, doves or young pigeons are acceptable burnt offerings for those who cannot afford a more expensive animal. In Genesis, Noah sends a dove out of the ark, but it came back to him because the floodwaters had not receded. Seven days later, he sent it again and it came back with an olive branch in her mouth, indicating the waters had receded enough for an olive tree to grow. "Dove" is also a term of endearment in the Song of Songs and elsewhere. In Hebrew, Jonah (יוֹנָה) means dove.

Jesus's parents sacrificed doves on his behalf after his circumcision (Luke 2:24). Later, the Holy Spirit descended upon Jesus at his baptism like a dove (Matthew), and subsequently the "peace dove" became a common Christian symbol of the Holy Spirit.

In Islam, doves and the pigeon family in general are respected and favoured because they are believed to have assisted the final prophet of Islam, Muhammad, in distracting his enemies outside the cave of Thaw'r, in the great Hijra. A pair of pigeons had built a nest and laid eggs at once, and a spider had woven cobwebs, which in the darkness of the night made the fugitives believe that Muhammad could not be in that cave.

As food 

Several species of pigeons and doves are used as food; however, all types are edible. Domesticated or hunted pigeons have been used as the source of food since the times of the Ancient Middle East, Ancient Rome, and Medieval Europe. It is familiar meat within Jewish, Arab, and French cuisines. According to the Tanakh, doves are kosher, and they are the only birds that may be used for a korban. Other kosher birds may be eaten, but not brought as a korban. Pigeon is also used in Asian cuisines, such as Chinese, Assamese, and Indonesian cuisines.

In Europe, the wood pigeon is commonly shot as a game bird, while rock pigeons were originally domesticated as a food species, and many breeds were developed for their meat-bearing qualities. The extinction of the passenger pigeon in North America was at least partly due to shooting for use as food. Mrs Beeton's Book of Household Management contains recipes for roast pigeon and pigeon pie, a popular, inexpensive food in Victorian industrial Britain.

See also 

 Doves as symbols
 Gamasoidosis
 Homing pigeon
 List of Columbidae species
Marquesan imperial pigeon
 Pigeon control
 War pigeon
 Kapotasana and Rajakapotasana, yoga poses named for columbidae

Notes

References

Further reading 
 Blechman, Andrew, Pigeons: The Fascinating Saga of the World's Most Revered and Reviled Bird (Grove Press 2007) 
 Gibbs, Barnes and Cox, Pigeons and Doves (Pica Press 2001)

External links 

 Columbidae.org.uk Conservation of pigeons and doves
 Dove videos on the Internet Bird Collection
 The differences between doves & pigeons
 Pigeon Fact Sheet from the National Pest Management Association with information on habits, habitat and health threats
 
 
 
 The Complete Guide To Pigeons (Columbidae)

 
Bird families
Game birds
National symbols of Cyprus
National symbols of Fiji
National symbols of Guinea
National symbols of Tonga
Extant Miocene first appearances
Taxa named by William Elford Leach
Peace symbols